The San Juan 34 is an American sailboat, that was originally designed by Canadian Hein Driehuyzen, modified by Don Clark and first built in 1980.

The San Juan 34 design is a development of the 1975 Crown 34.

Production
The Crown 34 was first built by Calgan Marine in North Vancouver, BC, Canada, with 30 examples completed between 1975 and 1979.

After production of the Crown 34 ended in 1979, the molds were sold to GlassFab of Monroe, Washington, United States. That company only built five examples, under the name Sun 1020. The molds were then repossessed by Calgan and later sold to the Clark Boat Company in Kent, Washington. After some modifications, the design became the San Juan 34, which was introduced in 1980 and built until 1986.

Design
The San Juan 34 is a small recreational keelboat, built predominantly of fiberglass, with wood trim. It has a masthead sloop rig, a reverse transom, a skeg-mounted rudder and a fixed fin keel.

Variants
San Juan 34
It displaces  and carries  of ballast.
San Juan 34 SD
It displaces  and carries  of ballast. The boat has a PHRF racing average handicap of 141 with a high of 141 and low of 141.
San Juan 34 TM
Tall mast model, with a mast about  taller. The boat has a PHRF racing average handicap of 132 with a high of 120 and low of 142.

See also
List of sailing boat types

Similar sailboats
Beneteau 331
Beneteau First Class 10
C&C 34
C&C 34/36
Catalina 34
Coast 34
Columbia 34
Columbia 34 Mark II
Creekmore 34
CS 34
Express 34
Hunter 34
Sea Sprite 34
Sun Odyssey 349
Tartan 34 C
Tartan 34-2
Viking 34

References

Keelboats
1970s sailboat type designs
Sailing yachts
Sailboat type designs by Hein Driehuyzen
Sailboat types built by Clark Boat Company